Love You is a 1979 American pornographic film directed by John Derek and starring Annette Haven, Wade Nichols, Leslie Bovee, and 
Eric Edwards.

Premise
Two couples decide to swap partners.

Production
Filming took place in Los Angeles, San Francisco, and Hawaii. According to star Annette Haven, John Derek's wife Bo produced the film and was constantly on set as her husband's consultant.

References

External links

1979 films
American pornographic films
Films directed by John Derek
1970s pornographic films
Films shot in Los Angeles
Films shot in San Francisco
Films shot in Hawaii
1970s English-language films
1970s American films